Tiriel Mora (born 19 October 1958) is an Australian television and film actor.

Early life
He is a son of the late Melbourne artist Mirka Mora and Georges Mora, German-born Australian entrepreneur, art dealer, patron, connoisseur and restaurateur. Georges came from a Jewish family of Polish descent. His mother Mirka (née Zelik) was of Romanian and Lithuanian Jewish descent. Tiriel's older brothers are film director Philippe Mora and art dealer William Mora.

Career
Mora is best known for his role as the hard-nosed journalist Martin Di Stasio, in the TV series Frontline, and the bumbling local solicitor Dennis Denuto, in the movie The Castle.

Mora also appeared in Qantas advertisements in the 2000s, as a Nebari called Silas in Farscape (1999-2003), as Judge Renmark in ABC-TV's legal drama Janet King (2014), and in the feature film Dinosaur Island (2014). He recently featured in Matt Drummond's family film, My Pet Dinosaur (2017). In 2018 he started appearing in Home and Away as a lawyer.

References

External links
 

1958 births
Living people
Australian male television actors
Australian male film actors
Australian people of French-Jewish descent
Australian people of Romanian-Jewish descent
Australian people of Polish-Jewish descent
Australian people of Lithuanian-Jewish descent
Jewish Australian male actors
Mora family
Australian people of German-Jewish descent
Male actors from Melbourne